Adrian Allenspach (born 31 August 1969) is a retired Swiss football striker.

References

1969 births
Living people
Swiss men's footballers
FC St. Gallen players
FC Winterthur players
FC Schaffhausen players
FC Aarau players
FC Lugano players
FC Sion players
FC Wil players
Association football forwards
Swiss Super League players
Swiss football managers
Sportspeople from St. Gallen (city)